Linden David Gaydosh (born January 4, 1991) is a Canadian football defensive tackle who is currently a free agent. He most recently played for the Toronto Argonauts of the Canadian Football League (CFL). He played CIS football with the Calgary Dinos. Gaydosh was drafted first overall by the Hamilton Tiger-Cats, but instead chose to sign with the Carolina Panthers.

College career

Professional career
Gaydosh was ranked as the 2nd best player in the Canadian Football League's Amateur Scouting Bureau final rankings for players eligible in the 2013 CFL Draft. He ranked 3rd best in both the December and April (final) rankings. Gaydosh had arguably the best performance of the 2013 CFL Combine. Duane Forde said that, "If rankings were based solely on the combine Linden Gaydosh would be the number one guy.".

Hamilton Tiger-Cats
He was drafted by the Hamilton Tiger-Cats of the Canadian Football League, with the 1st pick of the 1st round (1st overall) in the 2013 CFL Draft.

Carolina Panthers
On May 12, 2013, less than a week after being drafted into the CFL, Gaydosh signed with the Carolina Panthers of the National Football League. On August 2, 2013, Gaydosh was waived/injured by the Carolina Panthers due to a back injury. On August 3, 2013, Gaydosh cleared waivers and was placed on the injured reserve list. He spent the entire 2013 NFL season on the injured reserve. He was released by the Panthers on August 24, 2014; prior to the 2014 NFL season.

Hamilton Tiger-Cats (II)
On September 4, 2014, Gaydosh signed with the Hamilton Tiger-Cats (who held his CFL rights). He appeared in nine regular-season games, registering four tackles, two tackles for a loss and a pass knockdown. He added four tackles in two playoff contests. During an off-season workout in the spring of 2015, Gaydosh tore his Achilles tendon, which required surgery and caused him to miss the 2015 season. He returned to Hamilton in 2016, making appearances in both pre-season games and the season opener against Toronto.

Saskatchewan Roughriders
On October 12, 2016, Gaydosh was traded to the Saskatchewan Roughriders, however he was released by the club on August 2, 2017.

Toronto Argonauts
On August 6, 2017, Gaydosh signed with the Toronto Argonauts. Gaydosh played in 11 games for the Argos during the 2017 season, recorded the first three sacks of his career, and went on to win the 105th Grey Cup. Gaydosh played in 14 games for the Argos in 2018, made 5 tackles and his first career special teams tackle, and was signed to a contract extension following the season. In 2019, Gaydosh continued his role as a depth player and situational pass rusher, but made a few splash plays with six tackles, a sack, and his first career interception. However, he was released on February 7, 2020.

References

External links
 Carolina Panthers bio
 Toronto Argonauts bio

1991 births
Living people
Players of Canadian football from Alberta
Canadian football defensive linemen
Canadian players of American football
American football defensive linemen
Calgary Dinos football players
Carolina Panthers players
Toronto Argonauts players